"The Main Monkey Business" is an instrumental from Rush's 2007 album Snakes & Arrows. It clocks in at 6 minutes and 1 second, making it Rush's second longest instrumental, the longest being "La Villa Strangiato". Drummer Neil Peart remarked that it took him three days to learn the song.

Background 
The title of the song comes from a phrase lead singer and bassist Geddy Lee's mother used to describe someone up to no good:

See also
List of Rush songs
List of Rush instrumentals

References

2007 songs
Rock instrumentals
Rush (band) songs
Song recordings produced by Nick Raskulinecz
Atlantic Records singles
Songs written by Alex Lifeson
Songs written by Neil Peart
Songs written by Geddy Lee